This is a list of notable popular music violinists including fiddlers.

A

Shadmehr Aghili (hip hop, Persian classic, western classic) 
Armen Anassian (Armenian)
Laurie Anderson (experimental)
Darol Anger (jazz, "psychograss")
Gilles Apap (gypsy, swing, classical, bluegrass, Irish)
Emilie Autumn (rock, gothic, industrial)
Abhijith P. S. Nair (fusion violin, Indian, Western)

B

Aly Bain (Scottish and Shetland fiddling)
Alexander Bălănescu (founder of Balanescu String Quartet)
Miri Ben-Ari (hip-hop)
Byron Berline (bluegrass)
Andrew Bird (alternative, folk, jazz)
Charlie Bisharat (pop, rock, jazz, classical, folk)
Bitch (aka Capital B) of Bitch and Animal
Tracy Bonham (alternative rock)
Karen Briggs (pop, rock, jazz, classical, folk)
Linda Brava (classical, pop, folk)

C
Eddy Chen (classical)
Ann Marie Calhoun (bluegrass, pop)
Chris Carmichael  (classical, pop. country, folk, jazz, rock)
Vassar Clements (bluegrass, country, jazz)
Sharon Corr (The Corrs, pop, rock, folk)
Papa John Creach (blues, rock)
David Cross (King Crimson)
Regina Carter (jazz, classical)
Ray Chen (classical)
Chloe Chua (classical)

D
Daniel D. (contemporary, hip hop, R&B)
Jerald Daemyon (urban, contemporary jazz, R&B)
Charlie Daniels (country, country rock)
Rick Danko (The Band)
Saul Davies (James)
Taylor Davis (anime, classical, pop)
Ryan Delahoussaye  (Blue October)
Tymon Dogg (The Mescaleros, rock, folk)
DSharp (electronic dance music, classical, hip hop)

E
Warren Ellis (of Dirty Three, Nick Cave and the Bad Seeds, Grinderman)

F

Dave Favis-Mortlock (FiddleBop, jazz, folk)
Henry Flynt (classical hillbilly)
Alasdair Fraser (Scottish)

G
David Garrett (classical, pop)
Seth Gilliard (pop)
Johnny Gimble (bluegrass, Nashville session player)
Jerry Goodman (progressive rock, jazz)
Richard Greene (bluegrass, country, rock)

H

Petra Haden (alternative rock)
Anne Harris (Celtic music, folk rock, afrobeat, soul, blues, chamber music)
Don "Sugarcane" Harris (blues, rock)
Edward W. Hardy (classical, pop, musical theatre)
Lili Haydn (alternative rock)
Jerry Holland (Cape Breton fiddle music)
Hilary Hahn (classical)

I

Eileen Ivers  (Irish fiddle)

J

Jana Jae (of The Buckaroos and Hee Haw) (bluegrass, country)
Eddie Jobson (Roxy Music, U.K.)
Jinxx from Black Veil Brides

K

Mik Kaminski, member of the Electric Light Orchestra
Eyvind Kang (jazz and classical)
Judy Kang (classical, pop, hip hop, rock)
Doug Kershaw (Cajun)
Anna Katharina Kränzlein (folk rock, folk metal)
Olga Kholodnaya
Gundula Krause (bluegrass, cajun, folk, folk-rock)
Alison Krauss (bluegrass)

L

David LaFlamme (classical and rock)
Jim Lea (rock, pop)
Paz Lenchantin (A Perfect Circle, Zwan, Entrance)
Laurie Lewis (bluegrass, American old-time)

M

Ashley MacIsaac (Scottish-Canadian fiddling)
Manoj George (World fusion, Indian classical)
Sean Mackin (Yellowcard, rock, pop punk) 
Buddy MacMaster (Scottish-Canadian fiddling)
Natalie MacMaster (Scottish-Canadian fiddling)
Hugh Marsh (jazz, popular)
Mia Matsumiya (avant-garde, experimental)
Lucia Micarelli (classical, pop, most notably toured with Jethro Tull and Josh Groban)
Rob Moose
Bijan Mortazavi
Armen Movsessian (touring orchestra with Yanni)

N

Máiréad Nesbitt (fiddler for Celtic Woman ensemble)
Nash the Slash (classical, rock, experimental)
Sarah Neufeld (Arcade Fire, indie rock)
Nigel Kennedy (Beatles to heavy rock)

O
Mark O'Connor (bluegrass, folk, classical)
Helen O'Hara (Dexys Midnight Runners)

P
Owen Pallett (a.k.a. Final Fantasy, also plays with The Arcade Fire)
Una Palliser (classical, pop, folk, most notable toured with Shakira)
Itzhak Perlman (classical, most noted for violin solo in Schindler's List)
Anna Phoebe  (rock, pop, metal, classical, etc.)
Lorenza Ponce (new age, pop, rock, jazz, classical, folk, folk rock, bluegrass, country)
Antonio Pontarelli (rock)
Jean-Luc Ponty (jazz, jazz-rock)
Kalan Porter (pop, rock)

R

David Ragsdale (rock, progressive rock)
Mary Ramsey (10,000 Maniacs, John & Mary, rock, folk)
Bridget Regan (rock, folk)
Davide Rossi (pop, rock, classical)
Lettice Rowbotham (dubstep, pop, rock, classical)
Sergey Ryabtsev (Gogol Bordello, rock, folk)
Alexander Rybak  (classical, folk, pop)
Roopa Revathi (classical, western)

S

Jonathan Sevink (The Levellers)
Gingger Shankar (10-string double violin, of The Smashing Pumpkins)
John Sheahan (The Dubliners, folk)
Ray Shulman (Gentle Giant)
Rosemary Siemens (gospel, classical, pop, bluegrass)
Antoine Silverman (bluegrass, jazz)
Kyla-Rose Smith (Afropop, hip hop)
Sophie Solomon (Oi Va Voi, klezmer, folk, rock)
Eric Stanley (hip hop, pop, classical)
Robby Steinhardt (rock)
Lindsey Stirling (violin pop, electro, dance-pop, hip hop)
Dinesh Subasinghe (pop, Music of Sri Lanka, Baila, Celtic, Chinese, Buddhist music, rock, folk)
Dave Swarbrick (British/Celtic folk and folk/rock)
Sam Sweeney (British/Celtic folk and folk/rock – Kerfuffle, Bellowhead, Leveret, Made in the Great War)

T

Boyd Tinsley (Dave Matthews Band)

V

Vanessa-Mae (British, violin techno-acoustic fusion)
Maxim Vengerov (Israeli)
April Verch (Canadian)
Sarana VerLin (Dark Carnival) (electric 5-string) (rock, folk)
Susan Voelz acoustic electric 5 string, Poi Dog Pondering, Alejandro Escovedo, rock, electronica
Josh Vietti (hip hop, pop)

W
Noel Webb
Joan Wasser (The Dambuilders, indie rock)
Sara Watkins (Nickel Creek)
Jenny Wilhelms (folk)
J. Loren Wince (Hurt)
Patrick Wolf (experimental, alternative, folk, electronic)
D'arcy Wretzky (of The Smashing Pumpkins)
Gavyn Wright (classical, pop, soundtrack)

Y
Brett Yang (classical)

Samvel Yervinyan (touring orchestra with Yanni)
Diana Yukawa (contemporary, modern, classical, pop)
Kunnakudi Vaidyanathan (Indian classical, Carnatic)

Z

 Joel Zifkin (Kate and Anna McGarrigle and Richard Thompson etc)

References

External links
Legendary Violinists (a public arts website)
Famous Violinists of To-day and Yesterday by Henry C. Lahee, an 1889 publication at Project Gutenberg
Violinists on the Web: An alphabetical listing of web pages on violinists, past and present.

Popular